Herbert Dixon is a former professional golfer on the African American  during the segregation era. He is a member of the black players hall of fame.

He went to Union Academy and still lives in Bartow, Florida. In 2018, on receiving a local award at 98 he was reported to still be playing golf almost every day. He served in the Air Force during the Truman era. He was also an NAACP leader in Bartow. He learned to play and caddied at the Bartow Golf Course. A tournament was held in his honor in 2019.

Dixon was inducted into the African-American Golfers Hall of Fame in 2012. He was inducted into the Polk County Sports Hall of Fame in 2019.

References

Year of birth missing (living people)
Living people
African-American golfers
21st-century African-American people